The 2023 Ottawa Redblacks season is scheduled to be the ninth season for the team in the Canadian Football League. The Redblacks will attempt to qualify for the playoffs for the first time since 2018 and improve upon their league-worst  record from 2022. The team will attempt to win the second Grey Cup in Redblacks history and 11th in professional Ottawa football history.

The 2023 CFL season is scheduled to be the second season for Shawn Burke as general manager. After Bob Dyce served as the interim head coach to end the 2022 season, this will be his first full season as the team's head coach.

Offseason

CFL Global Draft
The 2023 CFL Global Draft is scheduled to take place on May 2, 2023. If the same format as the 2022 CFL Global Draft is used, the Redblacks will have three selections in the draft with the best odds to win the weighted draft lottery.

CFL National Draft
The 2023 CFL Draft is scheduled to take place on May 2, 2023. The Redblacks currently have ten selections in the eight-round draft. The team is scheduled to have the first selection in each round of the draft after finishing last in the 2022 league standings (losing the tie-breaker to the Edmonton Elks), not including traded picks. This would be the first time that Ottawa would select first overall since the 2015 CFL Draft.

Notably, the team acquired additional second-round and third-round selections after trading the rights to Woodly Appolon to the Edmonton Elks and Terry Williams to the BC Lions. The Redblacks also traded their fourth-round pick to the Edmonton Elks in exchange for Nick Arbuckle. The team also upgraded their eighth-round selection to another seventh-round selection after trading Llevi Noel to the Elks.

Preseason

Schedule

Regular season

Standings

Schedule

Team

Roster

Coaching staff

References

External links
 

2023 Canadian Football League season by team
2023 in Ontario
Ottawa Redblacks seasons